The following is a list of all video games in the Fire Pro Wrestling series produced by either Human Entertainment or Spike starting in 1989. Most of the titles in the Fire Pro series were released exclusively in Japan.

Human Entertainment Games

Fire Pro Wrestling Combination Tag

Fire Pro Wrestling Combination Tag is the first game in the series, released for the PC Engine by Human Entertainment on June 22, 1989. The game would later be re-released on March 13, 2007 for the Virtual Console on the Wii. The game was only released in Japan, and featured no official license. The game featured singles, tag team and tournament matchup modes.

Fire Pro Wrestling 2nd Bout

Fire Pro Wrestling 2nd Bout is the second installment of the series, featuring a few more match types and additional wrestlers than the previous game. Released two years after the original, featuring a new "World Champion Series", "Super Tournament", and "Elimination Match" modes. The game would be re-released on the Wii Virtual Console on May 27, 2008.

Super Fire Pro Wrestling

Super Fire Pro Wrestling was released in 1991 for the Super Famicom system. It was developed by Human Club and published by Human Entertainment.

Thunder Pro Wrestling Retsuden

 was released for the Sega Mega Drive. The game features an "Exciting" mode that allows players to take on each other, an elimination mode where ten chosen wrestlers compete to win, and a handicap mode where one wrestler must take on two opponents. The game was going to be released in the U.S. under the title Jesse "The Body" Ventura Wrestling Superstars, as published by DreamWorks, but was later cancelled. A ROM for the cancelled English version was leaked online in April 2016.

Fire Pro Wrestling 3: Legend Bout

Super Fire Pro Wrestling 2

Super Fire Pro Wrestling 3 Final Bout

 was released in 1993. This is the first game ever created with contribution from Goichi Suda. Due to complaints about the game's difficulty, Human released "Super Fire Pro Wrestling 3 Easy Type". In this version there is no edit mode but all of the hidden wrestlers are unlocked.

Gameplay

Characters based on wrestling stars such as WWF's Hulk Hogan and WCW's Rick Rude are featured in the game along with Japanese professional wrestlers like Masahiro Chono. Wrestler Morio Smith is named after Morrissey of The Smiths as Suda is a fan of the band. Each wrestler is ranked based on their attacking ability, defensive ability, and their running speed. An "edit mode" allows customized wrestlers to be created based on their wrestling type, the color of their skin, and a unique set of customized ring attire. A certain number of points also have to be spent on developing certain attacks (and their respective defense against these attacks from opposing wrestlers). Digitized voices from the wrestlers and cheers from the audience members are included. Two of the buttons on the Super Famicom controller are used for strong blows while another button is used strictly for low blows. Sprites in the game actually show wrestlers in different sizes to each other (depending on height and weight). A battle royale mode permits four wrestlers to face off against each other simultaneously. There are 56 different wrestlers to control; with eight playable wrestling legends. Referees are available and can be chosen by the player; each referee has his own level of strictness and essentially determine how long the match will last. It is possible to perform up to 300 different professional wrestling moves in the game.

Fire Pro Women: All Star Dream Slam

Officially licensed by All Japan Women's Pro-Wrestling

Super Fire Pro Wrestling Special

Super Fire Pro Wrestling Special was released in 1994. Wrestlers from the game are based on popular wrestlers from the WWF in addition to the WCW and several puroresu organizations. The game was only released on the Super Famicom system. The game's scenario was written by Goichi Suda, and helped make him famous with a controversial suicide plot line.

Fire Pro Gaiden: Blazing Tornado

Blazing Tornado was released by Human Entertainment in 1994. Although the design is similar to the majority of the games in the series, the controls are primarily based on button mashing, rather than executing properly-timed button presses. This installment features a different group of 8 (9 with the boss code) pro-wrestlers, who hail from all corners of the globe to compete, seeking to become a champion out of themselves.

Game modes are divided into single and tag team match tournaments. The single division allows players to challenge for the vacant Heroic Wrestling Federation/Neo Heroic Championship.

Wrestling Universe: Fire Pro Women: Dome Super Female Big Battle: All Japan Women VS J.W.P.

Officially licensed by All Japan Women's Pro-Wrestling

Super Fire Pro Wrestling: Queen's Special

Super Fire Pro Wrestling X

Fire Pro Wrestling: Iron Slam '96

Fire Pro Wrestling: Iron Slam '96 was developed and released for the PlayStation by Human Entertainment. It is the first game in the series to be done in full 3D. Its gameplay, however, retains the familiar timing-based grapple system found in all of the other Fire Pro games. Also, as with the other games in the series, the characters are based on real-life wrestlers that were popular at the time. Unlike its predecessors, it lacks the extensive Edit Mode used to build and create a wrestler.

Super Fire Pro Wrestling X Premium

Super Fire Pro Wrestling X Premium was released in 1996 for the Super Famicom. It has an extensive Edit mode where up to 80 created wrestlers can be stored and used in the game. The game features likenesses of over 100 real-life professional wrestlers that were included with fake names to prevent copyright infringement. Fan translations of the game surfaced online with the advent of emulators such as Snes9x and ZSNES. These translations not only converted the Japanese text to English, but also replaced the names of each wrestling likeness to its real-life counterpart. Unlike the more frenzied pace and button-mashing of arcade-style wrestling games, Super Fire Pro Wrestling X Premium focused instead on skill and specific timing. Each wrestler possesses three different 'levels' of attacks, Weak, Medium, and Strong, and must realistically wear down the opponent to use their most powerful attacks without being reversed or countered.

Fire Prowrestling S: 6 Men Scramble

Fire Pro Wrestling S: 6 Men Scramble was released in 1996 for the Sega Saturn. The game's story mode was called "Victory Road", which enabled "Title Match" when completed. The matches in Fire Pro Wrestling S: 6 Men Scramble include One Night Match, Open League, One Night Tournament, Elimination Match, Battle Royal, the debut of Death Match and the return of Gruesome Fighting that had not been seen since Super Fire Pro Wrestling Special. The game also includes a deep wrestler edit mode.

Fire Pro Wrestling G

Fire Pro Wrestling for WonderSwan

Spike Games

Fire Pro Wrestling D

Fire Pro Wrestling

Fire Pro Wrestling (released in Japan as ) was the first Fire Pro game to receive an official English translation and the first to be released on a portable system rather than a console.  A direct sequel, Fire Pro Wrestling 2, was released in 2002. The games use the A and B buttons for striking and grappling. True to many Fire Pro games, MMA is featured in the game and federations like Pride and The Ultimate Fighting Championship feature with fighters. The Octagon also made an appearance in this game, but was removed in the second for copyright issues.

Fire Pro Wrestling 2

Fire Pro Wrestling 2 (released in Japan as ) is a direct sequel to 2001's Fire Pro Wrestling. Fire Pro Wrestling 2 is not actually the second game in the series; it is merely the second game to be officially translated into English.

Reception

The game received "average" reviews according to Metacritic. In Japan, Famitsu gave it a score of 30 out of 40.

GameSpot named it the second-best Game Boy Advance game of September 2002. The game was a runner-up for the "Best Sports Game on Game Boy Advance" award at GameSpots Best and Worst of 2002 Awards, which went to Tony Hawk's Pro Skater 3.

Fire Pro Wrestling Z

Fire Pro Wrestling Returns

Fire Pro Wrestling in Mobage

Fire Pro Wrestling (Xbox 360)

Fire Pro Wrestling World (PC 2017 / PS4 2018)

See also

List of licensed wrestling video games
List of fighting games

References

External links
 Super Fire Pro Wrestling 3 Final Bout at GameFAQs
 Super Fire Pro Wrestling 3 Final Bout at Grospixels 
 Super Fire Pro Wrestling 3 Final Bout at Fireprozation 
 Super Fire Pro Wrestling 3 Final Bout at SNES Central
 

Games
Fire Pro Wrestling

Professional wrestling games
Video game franchises
Professional wrestling-related lists
Video games developed in Japan